John B. Laskin is a justice of the Federal Court of Appeal of Canada.

He was appointed as a law professor at the University of Toronto, and subsequently worked as a trial and appellate lawyer for over 30 years at Torys LLP in Toronto.

His uncle is Bora Laskin, formerly chief justice of Canada. His cousin is John I. Laskin, formerly a judge of the Court of Appeal for Ontario.

References 

Living people
Judges of the Federal Court of Canada
Year of birth missing (living people)
Place of birth missing (living people)
Academic staff of the University of Toronto Faculty of Law